The National Highway Authority (NHA) is a statutory body under the Ministry of Communications (MoCom) of Pakistan.

History
In 1978, the Government of Pakistan federalised five important inter-provincial roads and named them National Highways. That same year, the National Highway Board was set up to monitor the development and maintenance of these federalised roads by provincial highway departments. In 1991 by the Highway Authority of Pakistan Act was passed to monitor the works and administration of national highways, motorways, expressways and strategic roads.

NHA Jobs 2023

Function
The function of the NHA is to plan, develop, operate, repair and maintain all roads entrusted to the NHA by the Government of Pakistan. The NHA is the custodian of 39 national highways, motorways, expressways and strategic roads, combining for a total length of 12,131 kilometers (4.6% of the national road network). The NHA is committed to provide a safe, modern and efficient transportation system and play an important role in the development of Pakistan's micro and macro economy by enhancing national integration.

Powers and duties
 Advise the Government of Pakistan on matters relating to National Highways, Motorways, Expressways and Strategic Roads
 Collect tolls on National Highways, Motorways, Expressways and Strategic Roads
 License facilities on roads under its control
 Frame scheme(s) for construction, expansion, operation and development of National Highways, Motorways, Expressways and Strategic Roads
 Acquire land in accordance with legal procedures
 Research and development
 Procure plants, machinery, instruments and materials required for its use
 Enter into/perform all contracts as it may consider necessary
 Determine a building line between which and the RoW it shall not be lawful without the consent of the authority to construct or maintain any structure or make any excavation.
 Case studies, surveys, experiments and technical researches to be made or contribute towards the cost of such studies, surveys, experiments or technical researches made by any other agency.

See also

National Highways of Pakistan
Transport in Pakistan
Motorways of Pakistan

References

External links 
 National Highway Authority
 Tenders in NHA
 NHA at a glance

Pakistan federal departments and agencies
Pakistani road authorities
Regulatory authorities of Pakistan
1991 establishments in Pakistan
Government agencies established in 1991
Ministry of Communications (Pakistan)